The 1903 All-Ireland Senior Football Championship Final was the sixteenth All-Ireland Final and the deciding match of the 1903 All-Ireland Senior Football Championship, an inter-county Gaelic football tournament for the top teams in Ireland.

Match

Summary
This was the fourth year in a row in which London were heavily beaten in the final; after this, they were no longer given a bye to the All-Ireland final.

Sam Maguire captained London Hibernians.

Details

Post-match
The 1903 final marked the first time Kerry won an All-Ireland football title. They would go on to dominate the game for decades to come. Dublin were the dominant force in Gaelic football at this time with eight All-Ireland titles; within 40 years Kerry had surpassed this and have since left Dublin in the shade in terms of All-Ireland football titles secured.

References

Gaelic football
All-Ireland Senior Football Championship Finals
Kerry county football team matches
London county football team matches